A snow lantern is a hollow cone built of snowballs into which a light is put, usually a candle or a Japanese stone garden lantern Yukimi Gata. People lighting their own snow lanterns is one of Sweden's, Finland's and Norway's Christmas traditions.

Festival 
Hirosaki city holds an annual winter four-day Hirosaki Castle Snow Lantern Festival. The festival had attracted 310,000 visitors in 1999 and included 165 standing snow lanterns and 300 mini snow caves.

References 

Buildings and structures made of snow or ice
Light art